is an autobahn in Germany.

The A 524 is a short connector, heading west from Breitscheid and the A 52 towards Krefeld. The autobahn was built in the 1980s by upgrading the B 288. A short (1 km) section of freeway from the A 57 into Krefeld is also designated as part of the A 524.

Currently, an extension westward to the A 59 is listed as "high priority" in the latest Bundesverkehrswegeplan (Federal Transport Infrastructure Plan), and has started construction with completion slated for 2013. This project will be accompanied by a new free-flowing 4-way interchange to replace two low-capacity junctions: a T-intersection with the A 59 and a half-folded-diamond interchange with the B 8. Completion of the interchange is also set for 2013, with the older junctions expected to be closed at the same time.

Further extension along the B 288, across the Rhine and into Krefeld, is not listed in the Bundesverkehrswegeplan as being necessary at the present time. Rather, it is considered something that will only become important in the future. Therefore, it is only in planning, with construction beginning in 2016 at the earliest.

Exit list 

 

|}

External links
 Autobahn Atlas: A524


524